Holcocerus is a genus of moths in the family Cossidae.

Species
 Holcocerus didmanidzae Yakovlev, 2006
 Holcocerus gloriosus (Erschoff, 1874)
 Holcocerus holosericeus (Staudinger, 1884)
 Holcocerus nobilis Staudinger, 1884
 Holcocerus reticuliferus Daniel, 1949
 Holcocerus rjabovi Yakovlev, 2006
 Holcocerus tancrei Püngeler, 1898
 Holcocerus witti Yakovlev, Saldaitis & Ivinskis, 2007
 Holcocerus zarudnyi Grum-Grshimailo, 1902

Former species
 Holcocerus arenicola (Staudinger, 1879)
 Holcocerus beketi Yakovlev, 2004
 Holcocerus consobrinus Püngeler, 1898
 Holcocerus drangianicus Grum-Grshimailo, 1902
 Holcocerus ferrugineotinctus (Strand, 1913) (disputed)
 Holcocerus inspersus Christoph, 1887
 Holcocerus japonica (Gaede, 1929)
 Holcocerus kinabaluensis (Gaede, 1933)
 Holcocerus mongoliana Daniel, 1969
 Holcocerus pulverulentus Püngeler, 1898
 Holcocerus rufidorsius 
 Holcocerus rungsi (Daniel & Witt, 1975)
 Holcocerus sericeus Grum-Grshimailo, 1890
 Holcocerus strioliger Alphéraky, 1893
 Holcocerus verbeeki (Roepke, 1957)
 Holcocerus volgensis Christoph, 1893

References

 , 1940: Die Cossidae und Hepialidae der Ausbeuten Hone. Mitteilungen der Münchner Entomologischen Gesellschaft 30: 1004-1020. Full article: 
 , 1990: A Phylogenetic study on Cossidae (Lepidoptera: Ditrysia) based on external adult morphology. Zoologische Verhandelingen 263: 1-295. Full article: .
 , 2004: Carpenter-Moths (Lepidoptera: Cossidae) of Mongolia. Euroasian Entomological Journal 3 (3): 217-224. Full article: .
 , 2007: Holcocerus witti a new species from NW Iran (Lepidoptera, Cossidae). Atalanta 38 (3/4): 63–65.
Ревизия древоточцев рода Holcocerus Staudinger, 1884 (s. l.)

External links
Natural History Museum Lepidoptera generic names catalog

Cossinae
Moth genera